The Pacific Showband were a popular Irish showband group in the 1960s.

They were formed as a result of some members leaving the Earl Gill Orchestra and deciding to form their own band. They had a number of hits during the 1960s. They released 20 singles from 1964 to 1970 on the Pye Records and Tribune Records labels.

In 1968, Peter Law joined the band as a vocalist. The following year the band undertook their first tour of Canada, touring that country several more times before moving there permanently in 1971 and changing their name to Dublin Corporation. Under their new name, they had chart hits in Canada with "Melting Pot" and "Come and Join Us", and released the album Limited on Arc Records in 1973. Although they never released any further albums or singles, they remained active for a number of years thereafter as a touring band. Law and his wife, Barbara Dixon of the pop trio Maxi, Dick and Twink, also performed separately as co-vocalists for the band Sweet Chariot.

Past members

Shay Curran - piano/organ
Jimmy Dumpleton - guitar
Seán Fagan - vocals/trombone
Marty Fanning - drums
Austin Halpin - trumpet
Paul Keogh - guitar
Sonny Knowles - saxophone
Freddie Martin - trumpet
Dave Murphy - guitar
Harry Parker - bass
Paddy Reynolds - saxophone

Discography

45
 1967 - For He's A Jolly Good Fellow / She Thinks I Still Care - Tribune TRS 106
 1967 - My Jenny / Since I Don't Have You - Tribune TRS 110
 1968 - My Lovely Rose And You / I'll Remember You - Tribune TRS124
 1968 - The Long Black Veil / You'll Never Get The Chance Again - Major Minor Records MM545
 1969 - Remains To Be Seen / We Are Happy People - Tribune TRS 125
 1969 - My Mothers Eyes / Sunday Drive - Tribune TRS 128
 1969 - Ruby / Red Sails In The Sunset - Tribune TRS 131
 1970 - Momma's Waiting / Rollin' Common - Tribune TRS 140
 1971 - Melting Pot / Rollin' Common (as 'The Dublin Corporation', released only in Canada) - Franklin 643
 1972 - Come And Join Us (as 'The Dublin Corporation', released only in Canada) - Yorkville YORK 45067

LP
1969 - Peter Law & The Sound Of The Pacific,  Capitol ST 6324 (Canada)

Track Listing:
I Don't Want To Live (Greg Hambleton)
Remains To Be Seen (Kipner-Groves)
Red Sails In The Sunset (Kennedy)
My Jenny (Graham Bonnie)
Night Stick Shifter (Peter Law)
My Lovely Rose And You (Moran-George)
Ruby (Mel Tillis)
I'll Remember You (Kviokalani-Lee)
My Mothers Eyes (Gilbert-Baer)
We Are Happy People (Alan Dale)
Sing Me Back Home (Merle Haggard)
Since I Don't Have You (Rock-Martin-Beaumont-Bogel-Lester-Taylor-Berschren)

Musicians on album:
Shamey Curran: organ
Sean Fagan: vocal
Martin Fanning: drums
Austin Halpin: trumpet
Dave Murphy: guitar
Peter Law: vocal
Harry Parker: bass
Paddy Reynolds: saxophone

1973 - Limited (as 'The Dublin Corporation', released only in Canada), Arc DCLP-1
Track Listing:
 Truckin	
 Come & Join Us (Cousin Norman)	
 Hannigan's Hooley	
 Tie a Yellow Ribbon	
 Danny Boy	
 Goodnight Irene	
 The Letter	
 God Love Rock & Roll	
 Soul Shake	
 Unchained Melody	
 More	
 Somewhere

Musicians on album:
Shay Curran: trombone, flute & vocals
Sean Fagan: vocals & trumpet
Marty Fanning: drums & vocals
Austin Halpin: trumpet & vocals
Dave Murphy: guitar & vocals
Peter Law: vocals
Harry Parker: bass & vocals
Paddy Reynolds: saxophones, clarinet & vocals

References

External links
 The Pacific Show Band at Irish Showbands.com (story)
 The Pacific Show Band at Irish Showbands.net (pictures)

Irish musical groups
Pye Records artists